Agden is a civil parish in the Borough of Cheshire East and the ceremonial county of Cheshire, England. It is the site of Agden Hall. According to the 2001 census, the population of the civil parish was 142. Because the population is so small, it does not have a parish council, instead, relying on a parish meeting.

References

Villages in Cheshire
Civil parishes in Cheshire